Ten Strait Hits is the third compilation album by American country music artist George Strait, released on December 31, 1991 by MCA Records. It features all of Strait's singles from 1988-90.

Track listing

Chart positions

References

1991 compilation albums
George Strait compilation albums
MCA Records compilation albums
Albums produced by Jimmy Bowen